is a Japanese gunka published in 1894 during the First Sino-Japanese War. The first verse, along with that of "Sen'yū", was used in the interlude of 's song, "".

During the war, the Japanese Red Cross Society sent trained women nurses to military hospitals at Ujina in Hiroshima.  Women participation in the war as nurses gained international attention, and "Fujin Jūgunka," which was published at the time, was widely sung throughout the late Meiji period.  During the Russo-Japanese War, activity for women nurses extended to Manchuria and Korea, and there have been casualties.

References 

1894 songs
Japanese-language songs
Japanese patriotic songs
Works about nursing
Works about women in war